Harrison Lloyd (born 17 January 1995 in Australia) is an Australian rugby union player who plays for the Western Force in Super Rugby. 

His playing position is prop.

Reference list

External links
Rugby.com.au profile
itsrugby.co.uk profile

1995 births
Australian rugby union players
Living people
Rugby union props
Canberra Vikings players
Western Force players
ACT Brumbies players
Edinburgh Rugby players